Cheng Lin (born 1967) is a solo singer from China. Her first involvement in the music industry was at the age of 13 when she released the track "Little Horn". Since then she has sold 25 million albums across Asia. Cheng's latest album was Collaborations the album, which was produced by Grammy Award winning producer KC Porter.

Cheng is also a keen player of the erhu, a traditional two-string violin. She was taught to play at a young age by her father, and still uses the instrument in her music today. She studied in the United States and learned English, learning more about Western music in the process. She was the first Chinese national to have her music videos air on national television in China in the 1980s.

Music career

Early career (1981–89)
Her career started at the age of 13 when she released the track "Little Horn" in 1981. The track launched her to stardom in China, which followed with the release of her first album, Little Horn. This made her one of the first mainland commercial pop singers.

After releasing her first album, she went on to release two albums in quick succession. Her second album was titled Cradle of Childhood, and was released in 1983. A year later a third album was recorded, titled New Shoe, Old Shoe. The track "Panda Mimi" on the album went on to win the best track of the year in China, after it was Top of the Charts of the Year in 1985.

After launching her first three albums, she was issued an Outstanding Youth Award in 1986. In the same year she also performed at the charity concert for orphans in Guangzhou. A year later she released her fourth album, Songs of 1987. She released a number of songs from the album, producing a number of music videos in the process. These videos were some of the first music videos aired on Chinese national television. Later that year she appeared on the New Year's Eve TV special, performing the track "Flying with the wind (Xin Tian You)".

At the end of 1989 she returned to the same show, and performed the track "Kung Fu boy", which aired to over 1 billion viewers on Chinese television.

Post-university career (1993–2003)
Between 1989 and 1993 Cheng studied at the University of California. After finishing her studies, she performed a tour across China and the US throughout 2003–04. After spending a couple of years touring, she released the album Home Coming. It was her fifth studio album, and was produced by Hong Kong-based producer James Wong.

She went on to receive an award for her work in music, in Beijing. In the years that followed, she started performing more charity concerts in China. This included the concert in 1998 for disabled children. In 1999 she performed at a fundraiser for empowering women in rural areas. Between 2000 and 04, she received a number of awards for her work in music, while extending her charity work. This included sponsoring a charity build, in which a school for 400 pupils was built in Henan Province. She received an Outstanding Musician award during this period and also won a Special Contribution award for her work with Chinese music at the 5th Chinese Music Media Event in 2003. In the same year she also toured with KC Porter on his "Embrace the World Tour" and was also featured on the documentary DVD.

Recent career (2004–present)
In 2004, she  and James Wong won the "Golden Song" award for the track "the Only Earth", which they composed together. Later that year, she was invited to perform with Jean Michel Jarre at the "Sino France Culture Year" in Tiananmen Square and Forbidden City. The two performances were broadcast on CCTV globally.

In 2006, she was invited to tour with the band Ozomatli. While touring with the band she performed using the erhu. 

In 2007, she began working on her latest album, with the help of KC Porter. In 2008 she released a greatest hits album, including "Little Horn" and "Flying with the wind" (Xin Tian You). In the same year she also created a song for the Beijing Olympics, titled "Greater Than Gold".

In 2010, she was invited to work on the Global Village project with Spencer Proffer. She recorded the theme song "Citizen of the World". The music video for the song was shot on the roof of the famous Capitol Records Building in Hollywood. In 2011, the album she had worked on with KC Porter was finally released after her 2011 concert, with the title Greater than Gold. The main highlight in her recent career was the release of her greatest hits album.

Other work
In 1989 she was cast to appear in the film Black Snow. It starred  leading actor Jiang Wen, and went on to win the Silver Bear award in Berlin. 

In 2008 Cheng began work on a book titled Ray of Light.

Discography
Studio albums
Little Horn (1981)
New Shoe, Old Shoe (1984)
Song of 1987 (1987)
Home coming (1995)
Greatest Hits (2008)
Greater Than Gold (2011)

References

External links
demgmt.com

1967 births
Living people
Singers from Henan
Musicians from Luoyang
Erhu players
Chinese women singers